Streetcar Stop for Portland is an outdoor 2013 sculpture by Cuban American artist Jorge Pardo, located at the intersection of North Broadway and North Wiedler Street in Portland, Oregon's Lloyd District, in the United States. The fiberglass and steel structure measures 15' 9" x 33' 10" x 17' 3". According to the Regional Arts & Culture Council, which administers the work, Pardo intended it to be "best when it is dark and rainy and the interior lighting creates a warm glow that stands out like a beacon amongst its dark surroundings".

See also
 2013 in art

References

External links
 Streetcar Stop for Portland at Americans for the Arts
 Dedication of portland streetcar's latest public art project (October 7, 2013), The Leftbank Project
 Streetcar Stop for Portland and Inversion +/- receive national recognition (September 16, 2014), Regional Arts & Culture Council

2013 establishments in Oregon
2003 sculptures
Fiberglass sculptures in Oregon
Lloyd District, Portland, Oregon
North Portland, Oregon
Outdoor sculptures in Portland, Oregon
Sculptures by American artists
Steel sculptures in Oregon
Works by Cuban people